Just Go (Goodbye's the New Hello) is the debut studio album by South Korean girl group, Rania, released on February 8, 2013, through DR Music and Yedang Entertainment. The album was the last to feature members Riko, Jooyi, and Saem, though the latter would rejoin the group in 2016 as Yina.

Member Jooyi was on hiatus for Style, Riko departed the group shortly before Just Go.

Reception
Just Go (Goodbye's the New Hello) remains Rania's highest-charting release, peaking at #9 on the GAON Chart, and sold 2,582 copies. "Just Go" and "Style" also peaked on the GAON digital charts and the Billboard Korea K-pop Hot 100 Chart.

Track listing

References

2013 albums
Korean-language albums
DR Music albums
Rania (band) albums